Percy William Kilbride (July 16, 1888 – December 11, 1964) was an American character actor. He made a career of playing country hicks, most memorably as Pa Kettle in the Ma and Pa Kettle series of feature films.

Early life
Kilbride was born in San Francisco, California, the son of Elizabeth (née Kelly), a native of Maryland, and Owen Kilbride, a Canadian.

Career
Kilbride began working in the theater at the age of 12 and eventually left to become an actor on Broadway. He first played an 18th-century French dandy in A Tale of Two Cities. His film debut was as Jakey in White Woman (1933), a Pre-Code film starring Carole Lombard. He left Broadway for good in 1942, when Jack Benny insisted that Kilbride reprise his Broadway role in the film version of George Washington Slept Here.  According to Benny, Percy Kilbride was the same character offscreen and on: quiet and friendly but principled, refusing to be paid more or less than what he considered a fair salary. Kilbride followed up the Benny film with a featured role in the Olsen and Johnson comedy Crazy House (1943). In 1945, he appeared in The Southerner.

In 1947, he and Marjorie Main appeared in The Egg and I, starring Fred MacMurray and Claudette Colbert as a sophisticated couple taking on farm life. Main and Kilbride were featured as folksy neighbors Ma and Pa Kettle, and audience response prompted the popular Ma and Pa Kettle series. Pa Kettle became Kilbride's most famous role: the gentle-spirited Pa seldom raised his voice, and was always ready to help friends—by borrowing from "other" friends, or assigning any kind of labor to his Indian friends Geoduck and Crowbar.

Kilbride retired after filming Ma and Pa Kettle at Home in 1953; although it was the final film he worked on, a previous film in the series, Ma and Pa Kettle at Waikiki (filmed in 1952), wasn't released until 1955, after the release of Ma and Pa Kettle at Home in 1954. 

Kilbride disliked making the Kettle films. In a 1953 interview, he discussed the monotony of his career due to his portrayal of Pa Kettle:

I had my training on the stage, where I did a variety of roles. That's the fun of being an actor: to meet the challenge of creating new characters. But Pa Kettle is always the same. He can do anything; there is no need to establish any motivation. There's no kick in doing him over and over again. I have had dozens of offers to do television series, but I have turned them all down. I might do one-shot appearances; but I won't let myself get tied down to one character.

Death
On September 21, 1964, Kilbride and another actor, Ralph Belmont, were struck by a car while crossing the street in Hollywood. 

Belmont died instantly; Kilbride died three months later from atherosclerosis and terminal pneumonia which were caused by head injuries, having undergone brain surgery at the Good Samaritan Hospital in Los Angeles on November 11, aged 76. 

A veteran of World War I, Kilbride was buried at Golden Gate National Cemetery in San Bruno, California. Kilbride, who never married, left his estate to four nephews and a sister-in-law.

Filmography

References

Further reading

External links

 
 
 

1888 births
1964 deaths
Male actors from California
American male film actors
American male stage actors
American male television actors
American people of Canadian descent
Male actors from San Francisco
People from Greater Los Angeles
Road incident deaths in California
Pedestrian road incident deaths
Ma and Pa Kettle
20th-century American male actors
Burials at Golden Gate National Cemetery